Engine Company 31, also known as the Forest Hills Firehouse, is a fire station and an historic structure located in the Wakefield neighborhood in Washington, D.C.  It was listed on both the DC Inventory of Historic Sites and on the National Register of Historic Places in 2011.  The brick building was designed by Albert L. Harris and built in 1931.

References

Fire stations completed in 1931
Fire stations on the National Register of Historic Places in Washington, D.C.